Didi Perego (13 April 1935 – 28 June 1993) was a statuesque Italian actress who appeared in more than 80 films and television shows. She made her film debut in 1959's Death of a Friend. The same year, she starred in perhaps her best-known role as Sofia in Kapò.  She won the Silver Ribbon for Best Supporting Actress from the Italian National Syndicate of Film Journalists. She had a major starring role in Mario Bava's Caltiki - The Immortal Monster (Caltiki - il Mostro Immortale) the same year.

She worked steadily, mainly in Italian productions, while later having a supporting role in Sidney Lumet's 1969 film psycho-drama The Appointment. She also appeared in several British television series including The Avengers, Mr. Rose and Man in a Suitcase. Her last screen appearance was in 1992; she died of cancer the following year.

External links
 

Italian film actresses
Italian television actresses
1937 births
1993 deaths
Actresses from Milan
Nastro d'Argento winners
Deaths from cancer in Lazio
20th-century Italian actresses